is a former Japanese football player.

Playing career
Sato was born in Kanagawa Prefecture on March 7, 1972. After graduating from high school, he joined Yokohama Flügels in 1992. However he could hardly play in the match behind Atsuhiko Mori and Seigo Narazaki. In 1997, he got his opportunity to play when Narazaki left the club for Japan national team. The club was disbanded end of 1998 season due to financial strain. From 1999, he played for Sanfrecce Hiroshima (1999-2000), Nagoya Grampus Eight (1999, 2001) and Yokohama F. Marinos (2001-2004). However he could not play at all in the match from 1999. He retired end of 2004 season.

Club statistics

References

External links

biglobe.ne.jp

1972 births
Living people
Association football people from Kanagawa Prefecture
Japanese footballers
J1 League players
Yokohama Flügels players
Sanfrecce Hiroshima players
Nagoya Grampus players
Yokohama F. Marinos players
Association football goalkeepers